Mind U (Hangul: 마인드유, formerly known as Acourve (어쿠루브)) is a South Korean duo formed by Bridge Media in 2013. They debuted on October 25, 2013, with "What I Want To Say", then later re-debuted under Starship Entertainment on April 27, 2017, with "Loved U".  The duo departed from Starship on May 26, 2022.

Members
Jaehee (재희) — Vocalist
Godak (고닥) — Producer

Discography

Studio albums

Extended plays

Singles

Soundtrack appearances

References

Starship Entertainment artists
South Korean musical duos
Musical groups from Seoul
Musical groups established in 2013
2013 establishments in South Korea